Léa Palermo (born 7 July 1993) is a French badminton player. She started playing badminton at aged 8, then joined the France national badminton team in 2006. In 2009, she won the bronze medal at the European U17 Badminton Championships in the mixed doubles event. In 2010, she competed at the Summer Youth Olympic Games in Singapore. In 2015, she won the Slovenia International tournament in the mixed doubles event partnered with Bastian Kersaudy. In 2016, she won French National Badminton Championships in women's doubles event. She also the runner-up at the Orleans International in the women's doubles event and at the Estonian International in the mixed doubles event. In 2017, she became the runner-up at the Estonian International partnered with Delphine Delrue. She competed at the 2018 Mediterranean Games, clinched the women's doubles gold with Delrue.

Achievements

Mediterranean Games 
Women's doubles

BWF World Tour (1 runner-up) 
The BWF World Tour, which was announced on 19 March 2017 and implemented in 2018, is a series of elite badminton tournaments sanctioned by the Badminton World Federation (BWF). The BWF World Tours are divided into levels of World Tour Finals, Super 1000, Super 750, Super 500, Super 300 (part of the HSBC World Tour), and the BWF Tour Super 100.

Women's doubles

BWF International Challenge/Series (3 titles, 8 runners-up) 
Women's doubles

Mixed doubles

  BWF International Challenge tournament
  BWF International Series tournament
  BWF Future Series tournament

References

External links 
 
 

1993 births
Living people
People from Saint-Martin-d'Hères
Sportspeople from Isère
French female badminton players
Badminton players at the 2010 Summer Youth Olympics
Competitors at the 2018 Mediterranean Games
Mediterranean Games gold medalists for France
Mediterranean Games medalists in badminton
21st-century French women